is a railway station located in Kitakyūshū, Fukuoka.

Lines 

Chikuhō Electric Railroad
Chikuhō Electric Railroad Line

Platforms

Adjacent stations

Surrounding area
 SunLive Supermarket
 7-Eleven store
 Nakao Elementary School
 Okita Junior High School
 Yahatasangamori Post Office
 Nishi-Nippon City Bank Sangamori Branch
 Fukuoka-Hibiki Shinkin Bank Sangamori Branch
 Fukuoka Prefectural Route 281

Railway stations in Fukuoka Prefecture
Railway stations in Japan opened in 1957